A list of films produced in France in 1924:

See also
 1924 in France

References

External links
 French films of 1924 at the Internet Movie Database
French films of 1924 at Cinema-francais.fr

1924
Lists of 1924 films by country or language
Films